Yunnanilus pachycephalus is a species of ray-finned fish in the genus Yunnanilus. It is a small ( SL) stream-dwelling fish known only from its type locality, the Weizhangho stream, Yangliu, Yunnan, China.

References

P
Endemic fauna of Yunnan
Freshwater fish of China
Taxa named by Maurice Kottelat
Taxa named by Chu Xin-Luo
Fish described in 1988